Yuliana Mikheeva (born December 6, 1977 in Yerevan, Armenian SSR) is an Armenian retired swimmer. She competed at the 2000 Summer Olympics in the women's 50 metre freestyle.

References

External links
 Sports-Reference.com

1977 births
Living people
Sportspeople from Yerevan
Armenian female freestyle swimmers
Olympic swimmers of Armenia
Swimmers at the 2000 Summer Olympics
Armenian people of Russian descent